Drug combination may refer to:
Combination drug
Combined drug intoxication
Polypharmacy
Polysubstance use
Polysubstance dependence